Stelvio is a World Cup downhill ski course in northern Italy, considered as second hardest in the world. Located on Vallecetta mountain in Bormio, it debuted at the World Championships in 1985.

Widely considered as the second most difficult and scariest downhill course in the world, after the Streif at Kitzbühel, many consider it even as the toughest downhills of all. It hosted two World Championships (1985, 2005), and three World Cup finals (1995, 2000, 2008).

Dominik Paris has seven World Cup downhill victories on the Stelvio, a record for a single discipline on one course.

Course sections
...La Rocca, Canalino Sertorelli, Fontana Longa, Pian Del'Orso, Carcentina, San Pietro, La Konta.

World Championships

Men's events

Women's events
Combined event 1985 (slalom held on "Stelvio" and downhill on "Cividale" course).

Team event
Both Super-G and Slalom runs were held on "Stelvio".

World Cup

Men

Women

References

External links 
 Bormio ski map bormioski.eu

Alpine skiing in Italy
Skiing in Italy